Tushar Mehta is a senior counsel in India and is currently serving as the Solicitor General of India.

Mehta began his career as an advocate in 1987 and was designated as senior advocate in 2007 by Gujarat High Court. He was appointed as the Advocate General in 2008. Mehta was appointed as Additional solicitor general of India in 2014.

On July 1, 2022, Mehta appeared on behalf of the Delhi Police in Delhi High Court to oppose fact-checker Mohammed Zubair’s plea challenging Zubair’s police remand.

References 

20th-century Indian lawyers
Solicitors General of India
Living people
Year of birth missing (living people)
Senior Advocates in India
Supreme Court of India lawyers